Dan Drown (born October 24, 1942) is an American water polo player. He competed in the men's tournament at the 1964 Summer Olympics.

References

1942 births
Living people
American male water polo players
Olympic water polo players of the United States
Water polo players at the 1964 Summer Olympics
Sportspeople from Santa Ana, California